Marcel Emmerich (born 12 May 1991) is a German politician of Alliance 90/The Greens who has served as a member of the Bundestag since 2021.

Early life and education
Emmerich was born in Reutlingen.

Emmerich completed his bachelor's degree in Political and Social studies at the University of Würzburg in 2016. He has been studying Political and Administrative sciences at the University of Hagen since 2017.

Political career

With Alliance 90/The Greens
From 2011 to 2015, Emmerich was the state spokesperson for the Green Youth in Baden-Württemberg. In October 2015 he was elected to the state board of Alliance 90/The Greens in Baden-Württemberg. Since October 2017 he has also been the district chairman of the Ulm Greens.

Member of the German Parliament, 2021–present 
Emmerich moved up on 1 June 2021 as a member of the 19th Bundestag via the state list when Danyal Bayaz resigned. He has since been serving on the Committee on Internal Affairs.

Other activities
 Federal Agency for Civic Education (BPB), Member of the Board of Trustees (since 2022)
 German Federation for the Environment and Nature Conservation (BUND), Member
 Reporters Without Borders (RSF), Member
 VfB Stuttgart, Member

References

Members of the Bundestag 2021–2025
Members of the Bundestag for Baden-Württemberg
Members of the Bundestag for Alliance 90/The Greens
People from Reutlingen

1991 births
Living people